The preliminary round for the 1964 CONCACAF Pre-Olympic Tournament was a men's international football play-off between Suriname and Curaçao, with the winner qualifying for the final berth in the final tournament.

Suriname qualified to the final tournament with a 4–2 aggregate win over Netherlands Antilles, after a 1–2 loss in the first leg and a 3–0 win in the second leg.

Matches

First leg

Second leg

References

CONCACAF Men's Olympic Qualifying Tournament
Oly
Football qualification for the 1964 Summer Olympics